The 1951 Santa Clara Broncos football team was an American football team that represented Santa Clara University as an independent during the 1951 college football season. In their second season under head coach Richard F. Gallagher, the Broncos compiled a 3–5–1 record and were outscored by opponents by a combined total of 234 to 140.

Schedule

References

Santa Clara
Santa Clara Broncos football seasons
Santa Clara Broncos football